Azadirachtin, a chemical compound belonging to the limonoid group, is a secondary metabolite present in neem seeds. It is a highly oxidized tetranortriterpenoid which boasts a plethora of oxygen-bearing functional groups, including an enol ether, acetal, hemiacetal, tetra-substituted epoxide and a variety of carboxylic esters.

Chemical synthesis 
Azadirachtin has a complex molecular structure; it presents both secondary and tertiary hydroxyl groups and a tetrahydrofuran ether in its molecular structure, alongside 16 stereogenic centres, 7 of which are tetrasubstituted. These characteristics explain the great difficulty encountered when trying to prepare this compound from simple precursors, using methods of synthetic organic chemistry.

Hence, the first total synthesis was published over 22 years after the compound's discovery: this first synthesis was completed by the research group of Steven Ley at the University of Cambridge in 2007. The described synthesis was a relay approach, with the required, heavily functionalized decalin intermediate being made by total synthesis on a small scale, but being derived from the natural product itself for the gram-scale operations required to complete the synthesis.

Occurrence and use 
Initially found to be active as a feeding inhibitor towards the desert locust (Schistocerca gregaria), it is now known to affect over 200 species of insects, by acting mainly as an antifeedant and growth disruptor. It was recently found that azadirachtin possesses considerable toxicity towards African cotton leafworm (Spodoptera littoralis), which are resistant to a commonly used biological pesticide, Bacillus thuringiensis. Azadirachtin fulfills many of the criteria needed for a good insecticide.

This compound is found in the seeds (0.2 to 0.8 percent by weight) of the neem tree, Azadirachta indica (hence the prefix aza does not imply an aza compound, but refers to the scientific species name). Many more compounds, related to azadirachtin, are present in the seeds as well as in the leaves and the bark of the neem tree which also show strong biological activities among various pest insects  Effects of these preparations on beneficial arthropods are generally considered to be minimal . Some laboratory and field studies have found neem extracts to be compatible with biological control.

Azadirachtin is the active ingredient in many pesticides including TreeAzin, AzaMax, BioNEEM, AzaGuard, and AzaSol, Terramera Proof  and Terramera Cirkil.

Azadirachtin has a synergistic effect with the biocontrol agent Beauveria.

Nimbecidine is a natural product insecticide mix which is mostly azadirachtin, with some other limonoids.

Mechanism of action 
Azadirachtin interferes with a wide variety of insect pathways.
 The substance acts as a insect growth regulator. It antagonizes both ecdysteroid (mainly 20E) and juvenile hormone activities by reducing secretion of prothoracicotropic hormone (PTTH) and allatotropins from the corpus cardiacum complex. This neuroendocrine disruption reduces pupation. It also causes degeneration of other neuroendocrine glands.
 The substance disrupts reproductive functions, going as far as sterility in some insects. This is partially due to the aforementioned neuroendocrine disruption surrounding 20E and JH. It could also affect yolk protein and vitallogenin synthesis. It also reduces mating success by deterrence.
 The substance also deters feeding, making it an antifeedant. It disrupts the sense of smell to the point that some insects would rather starve than eat azadirachtin-laced food. If the insect ingests the compound, the substance further inhibits digestive enzymes and could leave an aversive taste memory by activating dopaminergic neurons.
 Azadirachtin additionally has a long list of cellular and molecular targets. It upregulates p53, disrupts protein synthesis possibly through binding to Hsp60, and changes the expression of many other pathways.

Biosynthesis 
Azadirachtin is formed via an elaborate biosynthetic pathway, but is believed that the steroid tirucallol is the precursor to the neem triterpenoid secondary metabolites. Tirucallol is formed from two units of farnesyl diphosphate (FPP) to form a C30 triterpene, but then loses three methyl groups to become a C27 steroid. Tirucallol undergoes an allylic isomerization to form butyrospermol, which is then oxidized. The oxidized butyrospermol subsequently rearranges via a Wagner-Meerwein 1,2-methyl shift to form apotirucallol.

Apotirucallol becomes a tetranortriterpenoid when the four terminal carbons from the side chain are cleaved off. The remaining carbons on the side chain cyclize to form a furan ring and the molecule is oxidized further to form azadirone and azadiradione. The third ring is then opened and oxidized to form the C-seco-limonoids such as nimbin, nimbidinin and salannin, which has been esterified with a molecule of tiglic acid, which is derived from L-isoleucine. It is currently proposed that the target molecule is arrived at by biosynthetically converting azadirone into salanin, which is then heavily oxidized and cyclized to reach azadirachtin.

See also 
 Arid Forest Research Institute (AFRI)
 Neem
 Neem cake
 Neem oil
 Nimbin, another chemical isolated from Azadirachta indica also thought to contribute to the biological activity of neem

References

External links 
  PDF Copy
 Extoxnet
 Neem: The wonder tree

Plant toxin insecticides
Terpenes and terpenoids
Acetate esters
Epoxides
Polyols
Carboxylate esters
Methyl esters
Alkene derivatives
Oxygen heterocycles
Enones